The mating-type locus is a specialized region in the genomes of some yeast and other fungi, usually organized into heterochromatin and possessing unique histone methylation patterns. The genes in this region regulate the mating type of the organism and therefore determine key events in its life cycle, such as whether it will reproduce sexually or asexually. In fission yeast such as S. pombe, the formation and maintenance of the heterochromatin organization is regulated by RNA-induced transcriptional silencing, a form of RNA interference responsible for genomic maintenance in many organisms. Mating type regions have also been well studied in budding yeast S. cerevisiae and in the fungus Neurospora crassa.

Mating-type switching

In the budding yeast Saccharomyces cerevisiae, mating-type is determined by two non-homologous alleles at the mating-type locus.  S. cerevisiae has the capability of undergoing mating-type switching, that is conversion of some haploid cells in a colony from one mating-type to the other.  Mating-type switching can occur as frequently as once every generation. Switching involves homologous recombinational repair of a site specific, programmed double-strand break, a highly organized process. This process replaces one mating type allelic DNA sequence with the sequence encoding the alternative mating-type allele.  When two haploid cells of opposite mating type come into contact they can mate to form a diploid cell, a zygote, that may then undergo meiosis.  Meiosis tends to occur under nutritionally limiting conditions associated with DNA damage.

See also 
 Mating of yeast

References 

Molecular genetics
Mycology
Sexual dimorphism
Mating